Novovasilyevo is a rural locality (a selo) in Volodarsky District, Astrakhan Oblast, Russia. The population was 409 as of 2010. There are 14 streets.

Geography 
Novovasilyevo is located 33 km southeast of Volodarsky (the district's administrative centre) by road. Blinovo is the nearest rural locality.

References 

Rural localities in Volodarsky District, Astrakhan Oblast